The 2015 Supercoppa Italiana was the 28th edition of the Supercoppa Italiana, Italian football supercup. It was played on 8 August 2015 at the Shanghai Stadium in Shanghai, China. With Juventus winning both the 2014–15 Serie A championship and the 2014–15 Coppa Italia, the game was played between Juventus and the 2014–15 Coppa Italia runners-up, Lazio.
Juventus won the game 2-0.

Background
Juventus made a record 11th appearance, and won a record seventh cup in their fourth successive appearance in the Supercoppa, with an overall record of seven wins and four defeats. Lazio made its sixth appearance, and first since 2013, with an overall record of three wins and three defeats. The two teams had met twice before (1998, 2013), each winning once.

Match

Details

See also

 2015–16 Serie A
 2015–16 Coppa Italia

References 

2015
Juventus F.C. matches
S.S. Lazio matches
2015–16 in Italian football
2015–16 in Italian football cups
2015 in Chinese football
2015
Sports competitions in Shanghai
2010s in Shanghai
August 2015 sports events in China
Football in Shanghai